Lermontova is a surname. Notable people with the surname include:

 Ekaterina Lermontova (1899–1942), Russian paleontologist responsible for creating the first Cambrian stratigraphy
 Julia Lermontova (1846–1919), Russian chemist

See also
 Lermontov (disambiguation)
 Lermontovo (disambiguation)